Below is a chronological list of works by Rabindranath Tagore between 1877 and 1941. Tagore wrote most of his short stories, novels, drama, poems and songs in Bengali; later he translated some of them into English.

List of works

With many of Tagore's stories, there has been more than one translation by more than one translator. For instance, The Supreme Night, One Night and A Single Night are all translations of the same story. Note that not all translations are of the same quality. Tagore wrote approximately 2,232 songs. In the below list, only the most notable are shown.

Collections of Short Stories

Texts

Online texts in English

Stories

Novels

Poetry

Drama

Essays

Lectures

Letters

Memoirs

Translations

Travelogue

See also
 Works of Rabindranath Tagore
 Adaptations of works of Rabindranath Tagore in film and television
An Artist in Life — biography by Niharranjan Ray
 Stories by Rabindranath Tagore (2015 TV series)
 Political views of Rabindranath Tagore

References

Further reading
 Alam, Fakrul; Chakravarty, Radha (2011). The Essential Tagore.
 
 
 
 Paul, S.K. Rabrindranath Tagore's Prose and Drama: An Evaluation of His Literary Contribution to South-Asian Studies. in: Paul, Samiran Kumar; Prasad, Amar Nath (2006). Recritiquing Rabindranath Tagore. Sarup & Sons, New Delhi. . pp. 117–141.

External links

 Bichitra: Online Tagore Variorum
 Tagore Web: The Complete Works of Rabindranath Tagore
 Bibliowiki: Rabindranath Tagore (formerly Wiki Livres)
 Internet Archive Collection (English and Bengali)
 Rabindra Rachanabali (collected Works of Rabindranath Tagore in Bengali; 30 volumes): available at NLTR website and Internet Archive
 For the songs, see Gitabitan
 Ek Ratri By Rabindranath Tagore

 Stories
Tagore, Rabindranath
Tagore